James Paterson  was  Dean of Argyll and The Isles from 1846  until 1848.

Notes

Deans of Argyll and The Isles